Eremophila arachnoides is a plant in the figwort family, Scrophulariaceae and is endemic to a few arid areas of Western Australia and South Australia. It is a little-known, broom-shaped shrub with white to mauve, trumpet-shaped flowers which are densely hairy on the inside.

Description

The inside and outside of the tube as well as the lobes are densely hairy. The petals lobes are pointed and are all equal in length. There are four stamens which do not extend beyond the end of the tube.

Taxonomy and naming
The species was first formally described by Robert Chinnock in 1979 and the description was published in the Journal of the Adelaide Botanic Gardens. The specific epithet is from Latin, meaning 'cobwebby', alluding to the long hairs in the corolla tube.

Two subspecies are recognised by the Australian Plant Census:
Eremophila arachnoides  Chinnock  subsp. arachnoides, commonly known as spider web eremophila, which has distinctly hairy leaves;
Eremophila arachnoides subsp. tenera  Chinnock , commonly known as slender-leaved eremophila, has glabrous leaves.

The epithet tenera is from the Latin meaning 'slender', referring to the long, slender leaves.

Distribution and habitat
Subspecies arachnoides occurs in small, isolated areas east of Kumarina in the Murchison biogeographic region where it grows in shallow limestone soils.
Eremophila arachnoides subsp. tenera occurs mainly in scattered places in the west of South Australia but there are also disjunct populations central Western Australia. This subspecies grows in red loamy soils on calcrete.

Conservation status
Subspecies arachnoides is classified as "Priority Three" by the Government of Western Australia Department of Parks and Wildlife meaning that it is poorly known and known from only a few locations but is not under imminent threat.
Eremophila arachnoides subsp. tenera is classified as "Priority One" meaning that it is known from only one or a few locations which are potentially at risk.

Use in horticulture
This eremophila has attractive foliage and flowers and the coloured fruits add to its appeal. It tolerates a wide variety of soils and prefers full sun although it will grow in partial shade and is very drought tolerant and frost resistant. It can be propagated from cuttings which may take several months to form roots and it can also be grafted onto Myoporum. After a few years, light pruning can be used to keep its shape compact.

References

arachnoides
Eudicots of Western Australia
Flora of South Australia
Plants described in 1979
Taxa named by Robert Chinnock